Ryuki Ueyama (born 17 April 1976 in Tokyo) is a Japanese mixed martial artist who most recently competed in the Lightweight division. He has fought for organizations such as Fighting Network RINGS, DEEP, Pancrase, Hero's and Pride FC.

Fight career

Fighting Network RINGS (1998–2001)
Ueyama began his Mixed martial arts career on 21 September 1998 at Rings - Fighting Integration VI. He lost to Yasuhito Namekawa by decision. Ueyama lost to Namekawa again by decision on 21 February 1999. Ueyama picked up his first win less than a month later at Rings Australia. He beat Dennis Kefalinos by knee bar in round 1. He was disqualified for eye gouging in his next fight against Lee Hasdell on 23 April 1999 in Japan. After his fight with Hasdell, he went unbeaten for over a year and a half with wins over Willie Peeters, Yasuhito Namekawa and Tim Thomas, with draws against Lloyd Berg, Dave Menne and Kosei Kubota. Ueyama eventually lost on 20 March 2001 against Sokun Koh at Rings - Battle Genesis Vol. 7.

DEEP & Pancrase
Ueyama drew with Kosei Kubota for a second time on 18 August 2001 at DEEP - 2nd Impact. He lost a decision against Kiuma Kunioku at Pancrase - 2001 Anniversary Show a month later. 
He returned to DEEP in December of that year, defeating LaVerne Clark by TKO. Then at Pancrase - Spirit 2 he lost to Kazuo Misaki by decision.

DEEP Japan Middleweight Champion
On 9 June 2002, Ueyama entered the DEEP Middleweight tournament. He defeated Seiki Ryo and Takaharu Murahama before beating Eiji Ishikawa in the final to win the tournament. He then beat Gilson Ferreira at DEEP - 6th Impact in September to bring his record to 9-6-4. He lost a decision in March 2003 to Hayato Sakurai. On 15 September 2003 Ueyama defended his title against Masanori Suda; the fight ended in a draw.

Pride Bushido & DEEP return
Ueyama made his Pride FC debut on 15 February 2004 against Sean Sherk, Ueyama lost by decision. In his second fight for Pride he lost to Ikuhisa Minowa by split decision. On 18 December 2004, Ueyama returned to DEEP and lost to Ryuta Sakurai by TKO.

Hero's
He made his Hero's debut in 2006 on Hero's 5 with a decision loss to Rani Yahya. This match was the opening round of Hero's 2006 Lightweight Grand Prix. Ueyama was submitted by Vítor Ribeiro on 12 March 2007 at Hero's 8.

DEEP (2009–2010)
Ueyama returned to the DEEP organisation once again in 2009 with a decision victory over Kosei Kubota. Later in 2009 he lost decision against Hidehiko Hasegawa at DEEP - 44 Impact. Ueyama drew his last fight to date against Hidetaka Monma on 17 April 2010.

Championships and awards 
DEEP
DEEP Middleweight Championship (1 Time, First)
2002 DEEP Middleweight Championship Tournament Winner

Mixed martial arts record

|-
| Loss
| align=center| 12–18–5 (1)
| Sho Kogane
| Decision (unanimous)
| Real 5: Real Fight Championship 5
| 
| align=center| 2
| align=center| 5:00
| Tokyo, Japan
|
|-
| Win
| align=center| 12–17–5 (1)
| Chris Hilger
| Decision (majority)
| Real 4: Real Fight Championship 4
| 
| align=center| 2
| align=center| 5:00
| Tokyo, Japan
|
|-
| Loss
| align=center| 11–17–5 (1)
| Roberto de Souza
| Submission (arm-triangle choke)
| RFC: Real Fight Championship 3
| 
| align=center| 1
| align=center| 2:13
| Tokyo, Japan
|
|-
| Loss
| align=center| 11–16–5 (1)
| Daryl Lokoku
| Decision (unanimous)
| Grachan 15
| 
| align=center| 2
| align=center| 2:38
| Tokyo, Japan
|
|-
| Loss
| align=center| 11–15–5 (1)
| Takafumi Ito
| Decision (unanimous)
| Pancrase: 258
| 
| align=center| 3
| align=center| 5:00
| Tokyo, Japan
|
|-
| Loss
| align=center| 11–14–5 (1)
| Naoyuki Kotani
| TKO (punches)
| RINGS: Reincarnation
| 
| align=center| 1
| align=center| 2:32
| Tokyo, Japan
|
|-
| Win
| align=center| 11–13–5 (1)
| Yutaka Ueda 
| Decision (unanimous)
| Grabaka Live: 1st Cage Attack
| 
| align=center|2
| align=center|5:00
| Tokyo, Japan
|Lightweight debut.
|-
| NC
| align=center| 10–13–5 (1)
| Won Sik Park
| No Contest (knee to downed opponent)
| DEEP: 48 Impact
| 
| align=center|1
| align=center|4:16
| Tokyo, Japan
|Catchweight (74 kg) bout.
|-
| Draw
| align=center| 10–13–5
| Hidetaka Monma
| Draw
| DEEP: 47 Impact
| 
| align=center| 3
| align=center| 5:00
| Tokyo, Japan
|Welterweight bout.
|-
|  Loss
| align=center| 10–13–4
| Hai Lin Ao
| Decision (unanimous)
| AOW 15: Ueyama vs. Aohailin
| 
| align=center|  2
| align=center| 5:00
| Beijing, China
| 
|-
|  Loss
| align=center| 10–12–4
| Hidehiko Hasegawa
| Decision (unanimous)
| DEEP: 44 Impact
| 
| align=center|  3
| align=center| 5:00
| Tokyo, Japan
| 
|-
|  Win
| align=center| 10–11–4
| 
| Decision (unanimous)
| DEEP: 41 Impact
| 
| align=center| 2
| align=center| 5:00
| Tokyo, Japan
|Welterweight bout.
|-
|  Loss
| align=center| 9–11–4
| 
| Submission (triangle armbar)
| HERO'S 8
| 
| align=center|  1
| align=center| 1:48
| Nagoya, Japan
| 
|-
|  Loss
| align=center| 9–10–4
| 
| Decision (majority)
| HERO'S 5
| 
| align=center| 2
| align=center| 5:00
| Tokyo, Japan
| 
|-
|  Loss
| align=center| 9–9–4
| 
| TKO (punches)
| DEEP: 17th Impact
| 
| align=center|  1
| align=center| 2:40
| Tokyo, Japan
|For DEEP Middleweight Championship.
|-
|  Loss
| align=center| 9–8–4
| 
| Decision (split)
| PRIDE Bushido 5
| 
| align=center|  2
| align=center| 5:00
| Osaka, Japan
| 
|-
|  Loss
| align=center| 9–7–4
| 
| Decision (unanimous)
| PRIDE Bushido 2
| 
| align=center|  2
| align=center| 5:00
| Yokohama, Japan
|Welterweight bout.
|-
| Draw
| align=center| 9–6–4
| 
| Draw
| DEEP: 12th Impact
| 
| align=center|  3
| align=center| 5:00
| Tokyo, Japan
|
|-
|  Loss
| align=center| 9–6–3
| 
| Decision (unanimous)
| DEEP: 8th Impact
| 
| align=center|  3
| align=center| 5:00
| Tokyo, Japan
|Welterweight bout.
|-
|  Win
| align=center| 9–5–3
| 
| Submission (armbar)
| DEEP: 6th Impact
| 
| align=center|  3
| align=center| 3:49
| Tokyo, Japan
| 
|-
|  Win
| align=center| 8–5–3
| 
| Submission (toe hold)
| DEEP: 5th Impact
| 
| align=center|  2
| align=center| 0:48
| Tokyo, Japan
| 
|-
|  Win
| align=center| 7–5–3
| 
| Submission (rear naked choke)
| DEEP: 5th Impact
| 
| align=center|  3
| align=center| 1:44
| Tokyo, Japan
| 
|-
|  Win
| align=center| 6–5–3
| 
| Decision (majority)
| DEEP: 5th Impact
| 
| align=center|  2
| align=center| 5:00
| Tokyo, Japan
| 
|-
|  Loss
| align=center| 5–5–3
| 
| Decision (unanimous)
| Pancrase: Spirit 2
| 
| align=center|  3
| align=center| 5:00
| Osaka, Japan
| 
|-
|  Win
| align=center| 5–4–3
| 
| TKO (corner stoppage)
| DEEP: 3rd Impact
| 
| align=center| 1
| align=center| 5:00
| Tokyo, Japan
| 
|-
|  Loss
| align=center| 4–4–3
| 
| Decision (majority)
| Pancrase: 2001 Anniversary Show
| 
| align=center|  2
| align=center| 5:00
| Yokohama, Japan
| 
|-
| Draw
| align=center| 4–3–3
| 
| Draw
| DEEP: 2nd Impact
| 
| align=center|  3
| align=center| 5:00
| Yokohama, Japan
| 
|-
|  Loss
| align=center| 4–3–2
| 
| TKO (kimura)
| RINGS: Battle Genesis Vol. 7
| 
| align=center| 1
| align=center| 2:16
| Tokyo, Japan
| 
|-
| Draw
| align=center| 4–2–2
| 
| Draw
| DEEP: 1st Impact
| 
| align=center| 3
| align=center| 5:00
| Nagoya, Japan
| 
|-
|  Win
| align=center| 4–2–1
| Tim Thomas
| Submission (ankle lock)
| RINGS Australia: Free Fight Battle
| 
| align=center| 1
| align=center| 9:11
| Brisbane, Australia
| 
|-
| Draw
| align=center| 3–2–1
| 
| Draw
| RINGS: Millennium Combine 2
| 
| align=center|  2
| align=center| 5:00
| Tokyo, Japan
| 
|-
|  Win
| align=center| 3–2
| 
| Decision
| RINGS: Rise 5th
| 
| align=center|  3
| align=center| 5:00
| Japan
| 
|-
|  Win
| align=center| 2–2
| 
| TKO (lost points)
| RINGS: Rise 4th
| 
| align=center|  3
| align=center| 3:05
| Japan
| 
|-
|  Loss
| align=center| 1–2
| 
| Disqualification (eye gouging)
| RINGS: Rise 2nd
| 
| align=center|  1
| align=center| 4:18
| Japan
| 
|-
|  Win
| align=center| 1–1
| 
| Submission (knee bar)
| RINGS Australia: NR 3
| 
| align=center|  1
| align=center| 4:40
| Australia
| 
|-
|  Loss
| align=center| 0–1
| 
| Decision
| RINGS: Final Capture
| 
| align=center|  1
| align=center| 20:00
| Japan
|

References

External links

1976 births
Living people
Japanese male mixed martial artists
Middleweight mixed martial artists
Mixed martial artists utilizing kickboxing
Mixed martial artists utilizing wrestling
Deep (mixed martial arts) champions